The 2017 United Kingdom general election was called by Prime Minister Theresa May on 18 April that year, and held 51 days later on 8 June. 'Election Polling' marked the following as each of the parties' key target seats, ones that were held by a low margin and could feasibly be won by a different party than in the 2015 election

List by party

Conservative

Labour

Liberal Democrats

SNP

Green

Plaid Cymru

Sinn Féin

DUP

Notes

References

2017 United Kingdom general election
Lists of marginal seats in the United Kingdom by election